Manavya (which means "Humanity" in Marathi Language) is a non-governmental organization (NGO) in India, founded by Vijaya Lawate, for rehabilitating children and women affected by HIV/AIDS.

References

External links 

 Official website

HIV/AIDS organizations
Health charities in India
Organisations based in Pune
Organizations with year of establishment missing